Ceryx xuthosphendona is a moth of the  subfamily Arctiinae. It was described by Wileman and West in 1928. It is found in the Philippines.

References

Ceryx (moth)
Moths described in 1928